Kalida High School is a public high school in Kalida, Ohio.  It is the only high school in the Kalida Local School District.  Their mascot is the Wildcat.  They are a member of the Putnam County League.

Ohio High School Athletic Association State Championships

 Boys Basketball – 1981 
 Girls Basketball – 1988, 1989, 1997

Notable alumni
 Gene Stechschulte,  Former MLB player (St. Louis Cardinals)

References

External links
 District Website

High schools in Putnam County, Ohio
Public high schools in Ohio